The Samoa skink (Emoia samoensis) is a species of lizard in the family Scincidae. It is found in the Samoan Islands and Cook Island.

References

Emoia
Reptiles described in 1851
Taxa named by Auguste Duméril